Don John Allen also known as Donald Allen (born 26 February 1947) is an Australian first-class cricketer who has played for Queensland in 11 first-class matches.

References

External links 
 
 

1947 births
Living people
Australian cricketers
Queensland cricketers
People from Lismore, New South Wales
Cricketers from New South Wales